Andrzej Marian Bartczak  (born 8 March 1945 in Kutno) is a Polish graphic artist, painter, illustrator and educator.

Biography
In the years 1963-1969 he studied at the Faculty of Tapestry and Fabric Design at the State Academy of Fine Arts in Łódź. His earliest works date from this period after graduation and include paintings, drawings, and prints. His artwork often depicts figures composed of highly expressive lines and rhythms with a variety of textures.

He is professor in the Department of Prints and Painting Academy of Fine Arts. Since 1984 he has been chairman of the Graphic Design workshops in Poland. He is a member of the International Association of Artists based in Switzerland. He received numerous awards, medals and awards in exhibitions and competitions for creativity and excellence in teaching in higher education art.

He lives and works in Łódź.

References

External links
Biography and style at culture.pl

Biography

20th-century Polish painters
20th-century Polish male artists
21st-century Polish painters
21st-century Polish male artists
Polish illustrators
1945 births
Living people
People from Kutno
Polish male painters